Aðalsteinsson is an Icelandic patronymic surname, literally meaning "son of Aðalsteinn". Notable people with the surname include:

Aðalsteinn Aðalsteinsson (born 1962), Icelandic footballer
Arnór Sveinn Aðalsteinsson (born 1986), Icelandic footballer
Baldur Ingimar Aðalsteinsson (born 1980), Icelandic footballer
Jón Hnefill Aðalsteinsson (1927–2010), Icelandic scholar and folklorist
Þorbergur Aðalsteinsson (born 1956), Icelandic handball player

Icelandic-language surnames